Ali Bin Fahad Al-Shahwani Al-Hajri (born March 6, 1960), is a Qatari diplomat who served as the Qatar Ambassador to the United States, Canada and Mexico from 2008 to 2012.

Life and career

Al-Hajri graduated from the University of Southern Colorado (now Colorado State University Pueblo) in 1983 with a Bachelor of Arts degree in political science. 

He has served in diplomatic positions for much of his career, including Morocco from 1995 to 1997; the United Nations from 1997 to 2000; Italy, Greece, Albania, Macedonia, Bosnia and Herzegovina, Croatia, Slovenia, and San Marino from 2000 to 2005. He was appointed Ambassador to the United States in 2008 and in 2009 was appointed non-resident ambassador to Mexico and Canada.

External links
Embassy of Qatar: Ambassador's bio via Qatar Embassy
Qatar: His Excellency Ali Fahad Falil Al-Shawany Al-Hajri via Washington Diplomat

1960 births
Living people
Ambassadors of Qatar to Canada
Ambassadors of Qatar to Mexico
Ambassadors of Qatar to the United States
Colorado State University Pueblo alumni